The historic county of Cornwall in south-west England was represented in Parliament from the 13th century. This article provides a list of constituencies constituting the Parliamentary representation from Cornwall.

In 1889 an administrative county of Cornwall was created. Unlike many other counties there has been no major change between the historic and administrative county boundaries. The first part of this article covers the constituencies wholly or predominantly within the area of the historic county. The second part refers to constituencies mostly in another historic county, which included some territory from the historic county of Cornwall (if any). The summaries section only refers to the constituencies included in the first section of the constituency list.

List of constituencies
The constituencies which existed in 1707 were those previously represented in the Parliament of England.

Key to abbreviations:-
 (Type) BC Borough constituency, CC County constituency.

Constituencies wholly or predominantly in the historic county

Constituencies mostly in another historic county

Periods constituencies represented

Summaries

Summary of Constituencies by Type and Period
Note: Dates of representation prior to 1509 are provisional.

Summary of members of parliament by Type and Period

See also

 Members of Parliament for constituencies in Cornwall
 Wikipedia:Index of article on UK Parliament constituencies in England
 Wikipedia:Index of articles on UK Parliament constituencies in England N-Z
 Parliamentary representation by historic counties
 First Protectorate Parliament
 Unreformed House of Commons
 Politics of Cornwall
 Cornish rotten boroughs
 Mebyon Kernow
 Constitutional status of Cornwall

Further reading
Edwin Jaggard Cornwall politics in the age of reform 1790–1855, Royal Historical Society/Boydell Press, (1999),

References
 Boundaries of Parliamentary Constituencies 1885–1972, compiled and edited by F.W.S. Craig (Parliamentary Reference Publications 1972)
 British Parliamentary Constituencies: A Statistical Compendium, by Ivor Crewe and Anthony Fox (Faber and Faber 1984)
 British Parliamentary Election Results 1832–1885, compiled and edited by F.W.S. Craig (The Macmillan Press 1977)
 The House of Commons 1509–1558, by S.T. Bindoff (Secker & Warburg 1982)
 The House of Commons 1558–1603, by P.W. Hasler (HMSO 1981)
 The House of Commons 1660–1690, by Basil Duke Henning (Secker & Warburg 1983)
 The House of Commons 1715–1754, by Romney Sedgwick (HMSO 1970)
 The House of Commons 1754–1790, by Sir Lewis Namier and John Brooke (HMSO 1964)
 The House of Commons 1790–1820, by R.G. Thorne (Secker & Warburg 1986)
 The Parliaments of England by Henry Stooks Smith (1st edition published in three volumes 1844–50), second edition edited (in one volume) by F.W.S. Craig (Political Reference Publications 1973) out of copyright

Cornwall, Historic county of
Parliamentary constituencies in Cornwall (historic)
Politics of Cornwall